HŽ series 6112 is a class of low-floor electrical multiple units manufactured by the Croatian company Končar Group, operated by Croatian Railways and the Railways of the Federation of Bosnia and Herzegovina. A total of 55 units were manufactured for Croatian Railways between 2011 and 2024 (28 of which were specially designed for the needs of urban-suburban transport - meaning that the passenger interior consists of less space intended for seating and more space intended for standing, for the purpose of transporting larger number of pasengers).  

The Railways of the Federation of Bosnia and Herzegovina also initially ordered one intercity train, with no indication of the company's intentions on ordering additional units. On Croatian Railways, 6 112 units can be found operating on suburban, regional and inter city level. 

The prototype made its first test run at the Zagreb – Dugo Selo line on July 3, 2011.

The construction, design and driving characteristics of the low-floor electric train enable optimized operations and increased traveling comfort in regional passenger traffic in regard to the length of the route.

Passenger space is uniform along the entire train, without partitions and stairs. Floor height is optimal for 550 mm high platforms. The train has up to eight doors on each side, which enables the rapid exchange of passengers, and an air-conditioned passenger compartment and driver's cab.

The main frame is a four-part welded steel construction linked with joints. The body consists of aluminum sandwich panels and windows. All bogies are equipped with air suspension systems, and two side drive bogies, while three free bogies are of the Jacobs type.

Three-phase asynchronous traction motors, fed from an electronic IGBT inverter provide high acceleration at start-up and a maximum speed of 200 km/h. The steering and diagnostic system is a microprocessor system that links the train subsystems with modern communication protocols that allow for linking up to three trains into one.

Sub-series' (Croatian Railways) 
6 112 series have several sub-series', as follows:

Sub-series 6 112-000 represents the units for regional traffic manufactured between 2011 and the first half of 2022

Sub-series 6 112-100 represents the units for suburban traffic manufactured between 2011 and 2021

Sub-series 6 112-200 represents the units for suburban traffic manufactured between the second half of 2022 and 2023

Sub-series 6 112-300 represents the units for regional traffic manufactured between 2023 and 2024

Sub-series 200 and 300 appear to be slightly different than those from initial sub-series (000 and 100), mainly regarding minor differences in painting schemes and frontal exterior design. 

As far as livery is concerned, units dominated by blue and white side coloring are intended for suburban transport, while units dominated by red and white side coloring are intended for regional transport on longer lines. Prototype of the train, unit 6 112 001, has its own livery scheme which is dominated by white and grey colors.  

All sub-series are compatibile for mutual coupling while in service.

Main characteristics of EMU (Electric Multiple Unit) 
 bright, passenger-friendly interior with customized design
 end-to-end walk-through passenger compartment, with no steps
 up to 8 doors on each side for rapid passenger access
 air-conditioned passenger and driver compartments
 system for audio and video information for the passengers
 vacuum toilet-system, also suitable for disabled persons
 ergonomically designed driver's cab
 welded steel construction, glued aluminium sandwich panels
 glass-fibre reinforced front section with automatic coupling
 air-suspended bogies
 redundant traction chain with IGBT power converters
 microprocessor vehicle control system with train bus and diagnostic
 multiple-unit control for up to three vehicles
 providing of the free wireless internet (WiFi) to passengers

Main technical specifications 

 Gauge:  
 Catenary supply voltage: 25 kV, 50 Hz
 Axle arrangement: Bo'2'2'2'Bo'
 Seating capacity: up to 220 
 Standing capacity: up to 300
 Floor height: 
 Door width: 
 Overall length: 
 Vehicle width: 
 Vehicle height: 
 Maximum weight: 
 Bogie wheel base
 powered bogie: 
 trailer bogie: 
 Continuous power (on wheel): 
 Starting traction force: 
 Max. acceleration at gross weight: > 
 Max. deceleration: > 
 Maximum speed:

References
http://www.koncar-kev.hr/docs/koncarkevEN/documents/24/2_1/Original.pdf 

6111

25 kV AC multiple units